Vyselki is the name of several rural localities in Russia:
Vyselki, Krasnodar Krai, a stanitsa in Vyselkovsky District of Krasnodar Krai
Vyselki, Samara Oblast, a selo in Stavropolsky District of Samara Oblast
Vyselki, name of several other rural localities
Vyselki, Vladimir Oblast, a village in Vladimir Oblast